Athanokkade is a 2005 Indian Telugu-language action thriller film written and directed by Surender Reddy. It was produced by Nandamuri Janaki Ram, Kalyan Ram's elder brother, under the banner N. T. R. Arts. It stars Kalyan Ram, Sindhu Tolani, and Ashish Vidyarthi in the lead roles, with the music composed by Mani Sharma.

The film was released theatrically on 7 May 2005. Following its commercial success, the film was remade in Tamil as Aathi (2006) and in Kannada as Lakshmana (2016). It was dubbed into Hindi as International Don.

Plot 
The opening scene shows Anjali sitting on a bench feeding a white pigeon by a calm ocean, and a retired DGP Bhavani Shankar coming and sitting by her side and exchanging pleasantries. Suddenly, she whips out a knife and stabs him to death with the help of her maternal uncle Ramachandran, saying that she has been waiting for this moment for many years.

After that, the scene shifts to Ram who lives with his loving parents and sister in New Delhi. He takes up a course in a Hyderabad college against his parents's wishes. Unable to be separated from Ram, his parents and sister come to Hyderabad along with him. It is revealed that Anjali is studying in the same college as Ram, and she has her own agenda to seek revenge on her family's killers, assisted by Ramachandran. 

Anna is a local gangster, who enters and is shown to have a dispute with another gangster named Pattabhai. To exact their revenge, Ramachandran attempts to kill one of Anna's aides, Abdullah, but fails to do so since Ram kills him. Naturally, Anna assumes that the killer can be none other than Pattabhai, so he kills him. However, Ram arrives and with help from Gulab Singh threatens Anna telling that he was the one who killed Abdullah and that he will also kill Sada, Anna's second main aide. Sada gets angry and goes to kill Ram, but Ram kills Sada while his family are horrified by his actions. Soon it is revealed that Ram is their adopted son and he is also on a personal mission to eliminate the people behind the murder of his biological parents. On being questioned, Ram reveals his past to his foster parents.

Ram's biological father was an honest ACP in Hyderabad, who arrested one of Anna's henchmen. It is revealed that Anjali and Ram are from the same family, as Anjali's father is Ram's father's brother-in-law. Anna pays Ram's house a visit and asks his grandfather to release his henchmen. When Ram's grandfather refuses, Anna threatens them only to find knives held at him by Ram's cousins. 

Ram's father arrives and arrests Anna. Infuriated, he pays them a visit with some of his henchmen and Bhavani Shankar. Together, they murder their whole family. Only Anjali, Ramachandran, and Ram survived the blast that annihilated their family. After the house is blown up by Anna, Ram escapes and is taken by his foster parents. Meanwhile, Anjali feels that one of her family members is still alive, as someone keeps a flower on the Buddha statue of their former house, which is now the city library. It turns out to be Ram.

On finding out his past, Ram's foster parents request him to come back, but he refuses. He then takes them to the railway station, but is nearly ambushed. He succeeds on defeating them and meets Anna, warning him to bring his brother from Dubai. Soon, he arrives and kills Ramachandran in revenge before challenging Ram to meet him at his brother's place. Ram arrives and after finding out that Anna has Anjali kept under hostage, he escapes after killing Ajay. Ram fights with Anna and Anna shoots Anjali and she dies. Angrily, Ram kills Anna and later Anjali survived the shot and Ram leaves with her and his foster parents, the only ones left in his family.

Cast 

 Kalyan Ram as Ram
 Sindhu Tolani as Anjali
 Ashish Vidyarthi as Anna
 Prakash Raj as Ram's father
 Chandra Mohan as Ram's foster father
 Brahmanandam as Johnny
 Rajyalakshmi as Ram's foster mother
 Surya as Ramachandran, Anjali's uncle
 Sudeepa Pinky as Ram's foster sister
 Chalapathi Rao as Ram's grandfather
 Venu Madhav as Gulab Singh
 Rami Reddy as Pattabhai
 Ahuti Prasad as DGP Bhavani Shankar
 Ajay as Anna's brother
 Raghu Babu as Abdullah
 G. V. Sudhakar Naidu as Sada
 Narsing Yadav
 Dharmavarapu Subrahmanyam

Soundtrack
The music was composed by Mani Sharma and released by Aditya Music. The song "Chita Pata" is based on "Dhoom Thanakkadi" from the Malayalam film Mullavalliyum Thenmavum.

Reception
B. Anuradha of Rediff.com opined that "All in all, this is a lavish masala film is worth watching". Jeevi of Idlebrain.com said that "On a whole, Athanokkade is a commendable effort by the debutant director Surendar and debutant producer Janakiram Nandamuri". A critic from Full Hyderabad wrote that "On the whole, a film worth a watch".

Box office 
The film was released with 72 prints initially and later 24 prints were added. The film became a commercial success. It ran for 50 days in 80 centres and crossed 100 days in 46 centres in India.

Remakes 
The film was remade in Tamil as Aathi (2006) and in Kannada as Lakshmana (2016). The film was set to be remade in Hindi as He, The Only One, but the film was never released. It was later dubbed in Hindi as International Don.

Accolades
Filmfare Awards South
 Best Villain - Ashish Vidyarthi

Nandi Awards
 Best Debut Director - Surender Reddy
 Best Character Actor - Chandra Mohan

References

External links
 

2005 films
Indian action films
Telugu films remade in other languages
Films directed by Surender Reddy
Films scored by Mani Sharma
2000s Telugu-language films
2000s masala films
Indian films about revenge
2005 directorial debut films
2005 action films
Films set in Visakhapatnam
Films shot in Visakhapatnam
Films set in Andhra Pradesh
Films shot in Andhra Pradesh